The following is a list of populated places in the Khyber Pakhtunkhwa province of Pakistan:

Khyber Pakhtunkhwa
Geography of Khyber Pakhtunkhwa